The  Ozbek Han Mosque is a mosque in Stary Krym, Crimea. The Ozbek Han Mosque is the oldest mosque in Crimea, built during the reign of Özbeg Khan in 1314.

History
Until the 14th century Staryi Krym was known as Solkhat, a prospering city during the reign of the Golden Horde. Early Crimean Khans had their capital in Solkhat until the first part of the 16th century, when the capital was moved to Bakhchisaray, and Solkhat gradually lost its importance as a cultural and economic center.

 
The Ozbek Han Mosque was built in 1314 and the madrasah, adjacent to the southern wall of the mosque, was built by Inci Hatun, daughter of Kilburun Bey, in 1332. Of the madrasah only ruins remain today. The mosque has a square floor plan, which reveals architectural features similar to those found in Anatolia during the Seljuk period. A unique feature of the mosque is its monumental entrance with a carved wooden door.

Today, Staryi Krym has a small but devoted Crimean Tatar population, and the Ozbek Han Mosque is once again functioning as a place of worship.

See also
Islam in Ukraine
Islam in Russia
List of mosques in Russia
List of mosques in Europe

References

Mosques in Crimea
Religious buildings and structures completed in 1314
14th-century mosques
Cultural heritage monuments of federal significance in Crimea